Box Elder Creek  is a tributary that joins the South Platte River near Kersey, Colorado. It rises in Elbert County, Colorado.

The creek flows through Elbert, Arapahoe, Adams, and Weld counties. It passes near Denver International Airport.

See also
List of rivers of Colorado

References

Rivers of Weld County, Colorado
Rivers of Adams County, Colorado
Rivers of Arapahoe County, Colorado
Rivers of Elbert County, Colorado
Rivers of Colorado
Tributaries of the Platte River